This list contains some of the best-selling songs in terms of sheet music sales in music publishing history.

During the Tin Pan Alley era, the sheet music sales determined if a song was a "hit", rather than Billboard charts and remained as the main indicator at least until 1929 during the Great Depression. Canadian historian Jason Wilson, commented the period "churned out the early modern world's most popular music". During that time, various lead sheet rose considerable amount of copies sold and music publishers profited. Although in music publishing industry overall, revenues and royalties were of relatively small scale as each individual copies were sold in terms of a few cents.

Before "Oh! Susanna" (1848) no American song had sold more than five thousand copies of sheet music. Stephen Foster's "Massa's in the Cold Ground" sales of 75,000 copies by 1852, was considered "phenomenal" since music publishers did not try to promote songs. The first song to became "popular" through a national advertising campaign was "My Grandfather's Clock" in 1876. Mass production of piano in the late-19th century helped boost sheet music sales. Toward the end of the century, sheet music was sold by dozens and even hundreds of publishing companies. 

The first title to sell one million ever (in a 12-month period) of sheet music is "After the Ball" on 1892 or 1893. However, according to other reports "Funiculì, Funiculà" achieved sales of one million copies in 1880 alone. From 1900 to 1910, over one hundred songs sold more than a million copies. Various "hit songs" sold as many as two or three million copies in print. With the advent of the radio broadcasting, sheet music sales of popular songs decreased and print figures failed to make a significant recovery after the World War II as Billboard reported by 1955 that the best-performed songs attained sheet music sales of only 300,000 units. By 1966, the United States House Committee on the Judiciary informed 100,000 copies of a title were "rares". "(How Much Is) That Doggie in the Window?" (1953) is believed to be the last song to sell one million of sheet music.

Selected million-sellers

Best-selling individuals

See also
Song plugger
Parlor song
List of women music publishers before 1900

Notes

References

Lists of best-selling singles